Ja imam šarene oči (I have colorful eyes) is the first EP by the Serbian alternative rock band Disciplina Kičme, released by the Slovenian record label Dokumentarna in 1985. A remastered version of the EP was rereleased on CD on the compilation album Ove ruke nisu male... 1 in 2000.

Track listing 
All tracks written by Zeleni Zub.

Personnel

The band 
 Koja (Dušan Kojić) — bass, vocals, bells
 Žika (Srđan Todorović) — drums, percussion [tambourine]

Additional personnel 
 Zeleni Zub (Dušan Kojić) — music by, lyrics by, artwork by [cover]
 Kele (Nenad Krasovac) — handclaps, drums on tracks 5 and 9
 Đorđe Kostić — handclaps
 Igor Petrović — photography
 Darko (Darko Milojković) — producer, handclaps
 Enco Lesić — recorded by
 Cvele (Miroslav Cvetković) — producer, recorded by
 Jugoslav Muškinja — trumpet

References 

 EX YU ROCK enciklopedija 1960-2006, Janjatović Petar; 
 Ja imam šarene oči at Discogs

1985 EPs
Disciplina Kičme albums
Serbian-language albums